Elizabeth Kemble (née Satchell; 1763 – 20 January 1841) was an English actress.

Life
She was born in London, and she was a talented performer when she married Stephen Kemble, of the Kemble family, in 1783. They acted together for several years both in London and in the provincial circuits.

She outlived him by 19 years. Her most famous role was Yarico from the opera Inkle and Yarico for which she was considered "universally" to be the best "ever seen". She died near Durham.

Reputation
Theatre manager Tate Wilkinson declared that next to Susannah Maria Cibber, Elizabeth Satchell was the best Ophelia he ever saw.

The editor of Blackwood's Magazine reported:"In all the parts she played she was impassioned; and all good judges who remember her will agree with us in thinking that she was an actress, not only of talent but of genius."

James Boaden was enthusiastic in her praise. In 1792, the Thespian Magazine  reported that  "[Satchell] summons the resistless tear of compassion into the eyes of the most rugged and insensible – and while sympathy and feeling shall hold a place in the human heart, her representation of Yarrico [sic] will be attended with delight, and remembered with the most unbounded admiration.”

References

Links
Dictionary of National Biography
Encyclopædia Britannica

1763 births
1841 deaths
18th-century English actresses
19th-century English actresses
English stage actresses
Actresses from London